Abgarm (also Romanized as Ābgarm) is a village in Qaleh Asgar Rural District, Lalehzar District, Bardsir County, Kerman Province, Iran. At the 2006 census, its population was 20, in 6 families.

These results can not be fully credited because of their old age.

References 

Populated places in Bardsir County